House of Angels is a Swedish drama film which was released to cinemas in Sweden on 21 February 1992, about a little village in Västergötland, Sweden, where an aging recluse lives in a mansion on a large wooded property. One day he is accidentally killed and an unknown relative by the name of Fanny Zander inherits the mansion and land. When she and her friend Zac arrive, they turn life in the staid village upside down.

The film was screened out of competition at the 1992 Cannes Film Festival. At the 28th Guldbagge Awards the film won the awards for Best Film and Best Director. It was also nominated for Best Actress (Helena Bergström), Best Screenplay and Best Cinematography (Jens Fischer). The film was selected as the Swedish entry for the Best Foreign Language Film at the 65th Academy Awards, but was not accepted as a nominee.

A sequel, Änglagård – andra sommaren, was produced in 1994. A second sequel, Änglagård – tredje gången gillt, was released on DVD and Blu-ray on 25 May 2011.

Cast
Helena Bergström as Fanny Zander
Rikard Wolff as Zac
Sven Wollter as Axel Flogfält
Reine Brynolfsson as Henning Collmer, vicar
Ernst Günther as Gottfrid Pettersson
Viveka Seldahl as Rut Flogfält
Per Oscarsson as Erik Zander
Tord Peterson as Ivar Pettersson
Ing-Marie Carlsson as Eva Ågren
Jan Mybrand as Per-Ove Ågren
Peter Andersson as Ragnar Zetterberg
Jakob Eklund as Mårten Flogfält
Carl-Einar Häckner as Guest at Party
Görel Crona as Guest at Party
Thabo Motsieola as Guest at Party

Stage musical
A Swedish stage musical adaptation of the film written by Edward af Sillen, who is also directing, and Daniel Réhn, with music by Fredrik Kempe will open at the Oscarsteatern in Stockholm on September 10, 2023. Starring two of Sweden's biggest musical theatre names Helen Sjöholm and Tommy Körberg.

See also
 List of submissions to the 65th Academy Awards for Best Foreign Language Film
 List of Swedish submissions for the Academy Award for Best Foreign Language Film

References

External links

1992 films
1992 drama films
Swedish drama films
1990s Swedish-language films
Films directed by Colin Nutley
Films scored by Björn Isfält
Best Film Guldbagge Award winners
Films whose director won the Best Director Guldbagge Award
Films set in Västergötland
1990s Swedish films